Leam, or historically Leam Farm, is a hamlet in the English county of Derbyshire. There are a number of buildings, which once formed a single estate. Leam is due south of Hathersage, close to Grindleford.

Notable people
 Sir Henry Cooper, New Zealand educator.

Hamlets in Derbyshire
Derbyshire Dales